This article contains information about the literary events and publications of 1792.

Events
 February 18 – Thomas Holcroft's the comedy The Road to Ruin is premièred at Covent Garden in London.
July – Molière's body is exhumed for reburial in the Museum of French Monuments in Paris, having been originally buried in the ground reserved for unbaptised infants, because actors were not allowed to be buried on sacred ground.
September 29 – The Theatre Royal, Dumfries, opens as The Theatre. By the 21st century this will be the oldest working theatre in Scotland.
unknown date – Henry Walton Smith and his wife Anna set up a newsagent's business in London that will become the bookselling chain WHSmith.

New books

Fiction
Hugh Henry Brackenridge – Modern Chivalry: containing the Adventures of Captain John Farrago and Teague O'Regan, his servant
Johann Baptist Durach – Philippine Welserin
Susannah Gunning – Anecdotes of the Delborough Family
Thomas Holcroft – Anna St. Ives
Charlotte Palmer
It Is and It Is Not a Novel
Integrity and Content: an Allegory
Charlotte Turner Smith – Desmond

Children
Elizabeth Pinchard – The Blind Child, or, Anecdotes of the Wyndham Family

Drama
Pierre Beaumarchais – La Mère coupable
Joseph Chénier – Caïus Gracchus
Leandro Fernández de Moratín – La comedia nueva
Thomas Holcroft – The Road to Ruin

Poetry

Samuel Rogers – The Pleasures of Memory, with Other Poems

Non-fiction
Saul Ascher – Leviathan oder über Religion in Rücksicht des Judentums (Leviathan or religion in respect of Judaism)
Yuan Mei (袁枚) – Suiyuan shidan (Recipes from the Garden of Contentment)
Arthur Murphy – An Essay on the Life and Genius of Samuel Johnson
Maria Riddell – Voyage to the Madeira and Leeward and Caribbean Isles, with Sketches of the Natural History of these Islands
Gottlob Ernst Schulze – Aenesidemus
Mary Wollstonecraft – A Vindication of the Rights of Woman

Births
February 10 – Frederick Marryat (Captain Marryat), English novelist and naval officer (died 1848)
April 5 – John Lavicount Anderdon, English writer (died 1874)
April 25 – John Keble, English poet (died 1866)
June 21 – Ferdinand Christian Baur, German theologian (died 1860)
July 2 – Thomas Phillipps, English book collector (died 1872)
August 4 – Percy Bysshe Shelley, English poet and radical (died 1822)
October 17 – Sir John Bowring, English political economist and miscellanist (died 1872)
October 20 – John Pascoe Fawkner, pioneer, newspaper publisher in Melbourne, Victoria, Australia (died 1869)
October 28 – Anne Knight (Anne Waspe), English children's writer and educationist (died 1860)
November 26 – Sarah Grimké, American abolitionist and suffragist (died 1873)
November 28 – Victor Cousin, French philosopher (died 1867)
December 18 – William Howitt, English historical writer and poet (died 1879)

Deaths
April 23 – Karl Friedrich Bahrdt, German theologian and writer (born 1741)
May 4 – Giuseppe Garampi, Italian scholar and book collector (born 1725)
May 12 – Charles Simon Favart, French dramatist (born 1710)
May 29 – Thomas Marryat, English medical writer and physician (born 1730)
June 4
John Burgoyne, English dramatist and army officer (born 1723)
Jakob Michael Reinhold Lenz, Baltic German dramatist (born 1751) (found dead early this morning, May 24 in the Julian calendar)
September 25 – Jacques Cazotte, French novelist (born 1719) (executed)
September – John Edwards (1747–1792), Welsh poet (born 1747)
December 7 – Marie Jeanne Riccoboni (Laboras de Mezières), French novelist (born 1714)

References

External link

 
Years of the 18th century in literature